Chaves is a Portuguese wine region centered on the town of Chaves in the Trás-os-Montes e Alto Douro region. The region was initially a separate Indicação de Proveniencia Regulamentada (IPR) region, but in 2006, it became one of three subregions of the Trás-os-Montes DOC, which has the higher Denominação de Origem Controlada (DOC) status. Its name may still be indicated together with that of Trás-os-Montes, as Trás-os-Montes-Chaves.

Located along the Tamega river, the region produces light bodied wines that are similar in style to wines produces in the Douro DOC.

Grapes
The main grapes of the Chaves region include Bastardo, Boal, Codega, Gouveio, Malvasia Fina, Tinta Carvalha and Tinta Amarela.

See also
List of Portuguese wine regions

References

Wine regions of Portugal
Chaves, Portugal